In Greek mythology, Antiphonus (Ancient Greek: Ἀντίφονόν means 'in revenge for blood) was a Trojan prince as one of the sons of King Priam of Troy.

Mythology 
Antiphonus was killed along with his brothers Polites and Pammon by Neoptolemus, Achilles' son, during the siege of the city.

See also
 List of children of Priam

Notes

References 

 Homer, The Iliad with an English Translation by A.T. Murray, Ph.D. in two volumes. Cambridge, MA., Harvard University Press; London, William Heinemann, Ltd. 1924. Online version at the Perseus Digital Library.
 Homer, Homeri Opera in five volumes. Oxford, Oxford University Press. 1920. Greek text available at the Perseus Digital Library.
 Quintus Smyrnaeus, The Fall of Troy translated by Way. A. S. Loeb Classical Library Volume 19. London: William Heinemann, 1913. Online version at theio.com
 Quintus Smyrnaeus, The Fall of Troy. Arthur S. Way. London: William Heinemann; New York: G.P. Putnam's Sons. 1913. Greek text available at the Perseus Digital Library.
Princes in Greek mythology
Children of Priam
Trojans